Alexander Johnston (1790 – 9 May 1844) was a Scottish Liberal Party politician.

He was elected at the 1841 general election as the member of parliament (MP) for Kilmarnock Burghs, and held the seat until his death three years later, aged 53.

References

External links

1790 births
1844 deaths
Members of the Parliament of the United Kingdom for Scottish constituencies
Scottish Liberal Party MPs
UK MPs 1841–1847
Scottish twins